The Glenelg tram line is a tram/light rail line in Adelaide. Apart from a short street-running section in Glenelg, the line has its own reservation, with minimal interference from road traffic.

The service is free in the city centre and along the route to the Adelaide Entertainment Centre in Hindmarsh. The service is also free along the length of Jetty Road, Glenelg to Moseley Square. Three routes in total operate on the network: Glenelg to the Royal Adelaide Hospital with select peak services that continue to the Adelaide Entertainment Centre; Glenelg to the Adelaide Festival Centre, which operates only on weekends and Adelaide Oval event days; and the Adelaide Entertainment Centre to the Adelaide Botanic Garden.

A 1.6 kilometre northern extension through the city centre opened in October 2007, extending the line from Victoria Square along King William Street and North Terrace to Morphett Street. A further 2.8 kilometre north western extension of the line along Port Road to the Adelaide Entertainment Centre opened in March 2010. A new junction and branch lines along the eastern end of North Terrace and King William Road opened in October 2018.

History

Inception

The line, originally named the Adelaide and Glenelg Railway, was built by a private company, the Adelaide, Glenelg & Suburban Railway Company, opening on 2 August 1873. The single track line was built to the  broad gauge, commencing at the Angas Street corner of King William Street and followed that thoroughfare to South Terrace, then ran through the South Parklands and the south-western suburbs on its own right of way to Brighton Road, Glenelg where street running recommenced, using Jetty Road to terminate outside the Pier Hotel on Moseley Square. A depot was erected in the parklands at South Terrace.

It was operated by small 2-4-0 tank locomotives, hauling two-axle end loading passenger carriages and open wagons for cargo. Raised platforms were not provided, the carriages being provided with steps for ground level loading. Run round loops were installed at Glenelg and South Terrace, trains being propelled in one direction along King William Street. Special services operated to Morphettville Racecourse after it opened in September 1873. Crossing loops were later installed at Goodwood and South Plympton.

Patronage during the first few years of operation rose from 468,000 in the first year (1873–74) to 727,000 in 1877–88.

On 24 May 1880, the Holdfast Railway Company opened the Holdfast Bay line from Adelaide railway station to Glenelg. It used the tracks of the South Australian Railways (SAR) between Adelaide and Mile End while a depot was built at St Leonards. Whilst one line was a profitable proposition, two were not, and both lines were almost immediately in financial trouble and merged to form the Glenelg Railway Company on 11 May 1882. A connecting line was laid along Brighton Road and the South Terrace depot closed.

In 1882, a horse tramway was laid along King William Street parallel to the railway. Local services between Angas Street and Goodwood were introduced by the railway using a Merryweather tram motor with an unpowered Rowan car as a trailer. In 1883 the SAR's Belair line was extended towards the South Coast and crossed the Glenelg line at Goodwood station via a flat crossing.

The Holdfast Bay line was the most unprofitable of the two, this being partly due to excessive charges by the SAR for use of its line. Moves were made to close the line but these met with strong opposition as closure would isolate Glenelg from the rest of the state. To overcome this it was proposed to lay in a connection at Goodwood.

In December 1899, the private company was acquired by the SAR, who continued to operate the line as a steam railway. The Glenelg line was duplicated from Goodwood to Brighton Road by 1910. The Holdfast Bay line was also duplicated from Mile End to St Leonards by 1914 with raised platforms being provided at most stations. To help reduce working expenses it was proposed to deviate the Holdfast Bay line to join the other at Morphettville and although a line was built, no connection was made and it was only used for race traffic. The Adelaide tramways had been electrified and to enable the line in King William Street to be duplicated, the railway was cut back to South Terrace in 1914. Railway passengers were carried by tram to Victoria Square.

Municipal Tramways Trust

In 1927, ownership and operation transferred from the SAR to the Municipal Tramways Trust (MTT). Steam trains ceased on 2 April 1929 and the line was closed to be rebuilt as a double track standard gauge, electrified at 600 V dc and converted to tramway operation. The Goodwood Overpass was constructed at this time, separating the new tram tracks from the conventional railway. The line was reopened on 14 December 1929 with the city terminus reverting to Victoria Square. The Holdfast Bay line closed on 15 December 1929 for conversion but this was not undertaken due to the onset of the Great Depression.

Thirty H type trams were built for the line, with a design influenced by North American interurban streetcars of that era.

There were one or two quirks in the earlier years, the most famous being the horse trams operated in the 1930s. These were trams specially constructed to carry race horses from stables located along the line to Morphettville Racecourse. This service was a carry-over from the days of the steam railway, which had also performed this function. Another unusual feature was operation of triple sets of H type trams in peak hours, and express trams that ran non-stop over a significant portion of the route. In 2006, only one express service remained.

The line was the only route to survive the closure of Adelaide's street tramway network during the 1950s, saved largely by its high proportion of reserved track, which enables fast journey for passengers and minimal interference with road traffic.

In the mid-1970s around 3,000 trips to the city were made "on an average day". The depot was relocated on 19 October 1986 from the corner of Angas Street and Victoria Square in central Adelaide to a new facility at Glengowrie, close to Glenelg.

Renaissance

In the 21st century, a series of investments were made to improve and extend the line. This began in May 2003 when the South Australian Government announced an upgrade of the Glenelg line infrastructure and the introduction of new trams.

Major work to upgrade the line took place between 5 June and 7 August 2005. Concrete sleepers were installed and much of the track renewed in an intensive nine-week project. Most of the 21 tram stops were reconstructed with higher platforms to allow level access to the new low-floor trams. The overhead electrical supply was upgraded and some minor modifications were made to the H type trams and Glengowrie depot. Tram services were replaced with substitute bus services during this period. Services resumed on 8 August 2005. The terminus at Moseley Square was reconfigured in September 2005 as part of a general redevelopment of the square.

Extension to City West

The South Australian Government announced a 1.2 kilometre extension from Victoria Square along King William Street to Adelaide railway station and the western city campus of the University of South Australia in April 2005. An additional two Bombardier Flexity Classic trams were ordered to cater for services on the city centre extension.

Construction work on the extension commenced in early 2007. A new Victoria Square stop opened on 6 August 2007. The stop moved from the centre of the square to the western side. Testing of the extension began in September 2007.

The extension opened on 14 October 2007. Initially, a shuttle service running between Victoria Square and City West tram stop was provided. Normal services continued to run between Victoria Square and Glenelg. A new timetable began on 15 October 2007 with through services from Glenelg to City West and a free shuttle service between South Terrace and City West.

South Road overpass

An overpass crossing South Road was announced in the 2007 South Australian Budget. The project was built in conjunction with the Anzac Highway Underpass. Construction by McConnell Dowell commenced in July 2009. On 8 December 2009, the overpass opened to allow trams to pass over it, however the South Road tram stop was not operational until 15 March 2010.

Extension to Adelaide Entertainment Centre

A$100 million extension to the Adelaide Entertainment Centre was announced in the 2008 South Australian Budget. Planning commenced soon after and the state cabinet approved the extension in November 2008.

Construction work began on 11 May 2009.
Testing began in February 2010 and the extension opened on 22 March 2010.

Extension to East End
After a lobbying campaign from businesses and institutions located in the area, a $50 million project to construct a one-kilometre branch along the eastern section of North Terrace was announced in the 2016 South Australian Budget. The extension enabled the creation of shuttle service between the old Royal Adelaide Hospital and the Adelaide Entertainment Centre. Services operate every ten minutes. An expansion of the project was also announced in December 2016. This saw a 100-metre northern spur line constructed from North Terrace on King William Road. The intention was to avoid modifying the North Terrace-King William Road intersection twice - once for the East End extension, then again if future northernbound expansion goes ahead - by combining all the work into a single program. Three new trams were ordered. The changes resulted in an extra $20 million being added to the budget for the project.

The eastern branch includes three new stops on North Terrace to service the South Australian Museum, University of Adelaide and Ayers House, while the northern branch will include a single stop on King William Road to service Elder Park and the Riverbank precinct.

A tender to design and construct the project was called in December 2016. Preliminary works commenced in July 2017, with major works commencing in October, and are expected to be completed by early 2018. In August 2017, it was revealed that the planned rail junction at the North Terrace-King William Road intersection would be altered, disallowing trams to turn left onto King William Road from North Terrace. Further controversy arose in late 2017 when it was revealed that trams would also not be able to turn right onto North Terrace from King William Street, disallowing future services from Glenelg to continue directly to East End and beyond.

Originally expected to be completed in early 2018, electrical faults pushed the opening date back to July 2018, while signalling faults uncovered during testing weeks before the scheduled opening date of 29 July further delayed the project. In addition, the company responsible for construction entered voluntary administration in August 2018.

The extension was opened on 13 October 2018, with services running Glenelg to Royal Adelaide Hospital, with limited peak services continuing to Entertainment Centre, and Entertainment Centre to Botanic Gardens. A route running from Glenelg to Festival Plaza runs only on weekends and Adelaide Oval event days.

Routes
On 13 October 2018, following the opening of the Botanic Gardens and Festival Plaza extensions, the network timetable was restructured and new routes opened to service the new stations. The primary route from Glenelg was curtailed to terminate at the Royal Adelaide Hospital, and two additional routes were introduced to leave three routes in total:
 Glenelg to Royal Adelaide Hospital: typical 5-minute frequency, select peak services continue to Entertainment Centre
 Glenelg to Festival Plaza: operates only on weekends and Adelaide Oval event days
 Entertainment Centre to Botanic Gardens: typical 10-minute frequency

Controversy
Due to the increased popularity of the service beyond the city after the City West extension, the trams service dramatically exceeded its capacity, with over 100,000 extra trips for the three months from November 2007, compared the same period the previous year. This resulted in intensive overcrowding on board the trams, and many passengers were unable to board trams during peak hours. The extension of the tramway along King William Street and North Terrace was blamed by critics for increased congestion within the centre of Adelaide, but no actual evidence of this occurring was identified.

There have been a small number of minor derailments along the tramway, including one on Melbourne Cup Day, 6 November 2007. On several occasions, some Flexity trams experienced breakdown problems.

References

External links

Glenelg tram (Adelaide Metro)
Bay Tram Twilight
Type H Trams
Bill's Glenelg tram pages

Transport in Adelaide
Light rail in Australia
Tram transport in South Australia
5 ft 3 in gauge railways in Australia
Standard gauge railways in Australia
1873 establishments in Australia